Dom José, Prince of Brazil, Duke of Braganza (20 August 1761 – 11 September 1788) was the heir apparent to the Kingdom of Portugal until his death in 1788, as the eldest child of Queen Dona Maria I of Portugal and King Dom Pedro III of Portugal, members of the House of Braganza.

José died of smallpox at the age of 27, causing his younger and ill-prepared brother, Infante João, to become heir-apparent, Prince Regent to their mentally ill mother and eventually King. João's regency and reign would be a turbulent one, seeing the Napoleonic invasion of Portugal and the loss of the Portuguese Empire's largest and wealthiest colony, Brazil.

Early life 

José was born at the Real Barraca where the Palace of Ajuda in Lisbon stands today. He was named after his grandfather who was the ruling King of Portugal at the time of his birth. His grandfather created him Prince of Beira, this being the first time when the title was given to a male.

At the time of his birth, his parents were the Prince and Princess of Brazil, his mother the Heir presumptive of the king.

Marriage 
On 21 February 1777, when he was 15 years old, he married his 30-year-old aunt the Infanta Benedita of Portugal. Benedita was an attractive woman and the main candidate for the wife of José. The marriage was the express wish of the dying king, Dom José.

They had no children, however she miscarried twice: in 1781 and in 1786. Three days after their wedding, José's grandfather and Benedita's father the old King José died, and his mother succeeded as queen regnant. Infante José became the new crown prince, being accorded the titles Prince of Brazil and 14th Duke of Braganza.

Death and legacy

José died at the age of 27 of smallpox. Upon José's death, his younger brother Infante John became heir-apparent to the throne and thus the new Prince of Brazil. José died on the Ajuda Royal Complex in Lisbon. His mother and wife were very badly affected by his death. His wife would be known as the "Dowager Princess of Brazil" till her death in 1829.

José is buried in the Pantheon of the House of Braganza in Lisbon, the resting place for most of the members of the House of Braganza.

Honours
  Kingdom of Portugal: Grand Commander of the Three Military Orders of Christ, Aviz and St. James
 : Knight of the Golden Fleece, 10 May 1785

Ancestors

Endnotes

Footnotes

References

(Portuguese) A Prince that was almost a King
(Portuguese) Orders from King José to Prince José
 Carlota Joaquina, Queen of Portugal

External links

1761 births
1788 deaths
Deaths from smallpox
Heirs apparent who never acceded
Infectious disease deaths in Portugal
18th-century Portuguese people
Burials at the Monastery of São Vicente de Fora
House of Braganza
Princes of Brazil
Dukes of Braganza
Princes of Beira
Dukes of Barcelos
Portuguese infantes
People from Lisbon
3
3
3
Knights of the Golden Fleece of Spain
Sons of kings